Clephydroneura is a genus of robberfly found mainly in tropical Asia. There are numerous species which can only be identified to species by dissection of the genitalia of males.

An incomplete list of species that have been described in this genus includes:
 Clephydroneura alveolusa 
 Clephydroneura anamalaiensis 
 Clephydroneura annulatus 
 Clephydroneura apicalis 
 Clephydroneura apicihirta 
 Clephydroneura bangalorensis 
 Clephydroneura bannerghattaensis 
 Clephydroneura bella 
 Clephydroneura bengalensis 
 Clephydroneura bidensa 
 Clephydroneura brevipennis 
 Clephydroneura cilia 
 Clephydroneura cochinensis 
 Clephydroneura cristata 
 Clephydroneura cylindra 
 Clephydroneura dasi 
 Clephydroneura distincta 
 Clephydroneura duvaucelii 
 Clephydroneura exilis 
 Clephydroneura finita 
 Clephydroneura flavicornis 
 Clephydroneura fulvihirta 
 Clephydroneura furca 
 Clephydroneura ghorpadei 
 Clephydroneura ghoshi 
 Clephydroneura gravelyi 
 Clephydroneura gymmura 
 Clephydroneura hainanensis 
 Clephydroneura hamiforceps 
 Clephydroneura indiana 
 Clephydroneura involuta 
 Clephydroneura karikalensis 
 Clephydroneura karnatakensis 
 Clephydroneura lali 
 Clephydroneura martini 
 Clephydroneura minor 
 Clephydroneura mudigorensis 
 Clephydroneura mysorensis 
 Clephydroneura nelsoni 
 Clephydroneura nigrata 
 Clephydroneura nilaparvata 
 Clephydroneura oldroydi 
 Clephydroneura promboonae 
 Clephydroneura pulla 
 Clephydroneura robusta 
 Clephydroneura rossi 
 Clephydroneura semirufa 
 Clephydroneura serrula 
 Clephydroneura singhi 
 Clephydroneura sundaica 
 Clephydroneura trifissura 
 Clephydroneura valida 
 Clephydroneura wilcoxi 
 Clephydroneura xanthopa 
 Clephydroneura xanthopha

References 

Asilidae genera
Asilidae
Taxa named by Theodor Becker